Disk or disc may refer to:
 Disk (mathematics), a geometric shape
 Disk storage

Music
 Disc (band), an American experimental music band
 Disk (album), a 1995 EP by Moby

Other uses
 Disk (functional analysis), a subset of a vector space
 Disc (galaxy), a disc-shaped group of stars
 Disc (magazine), a British music magazine
 Disc harrow, a farm implement
 DISC assessment, a group of psychometric tests
 Death-inducing signaling complex
 Defence Intelligence and Security Centre or Joint Intelligence Training Group, the headquarters of the Defence College of Intelligence and the British Army Intelligence Corps
 Delaware Independent School Conference, a high-school sports conference
 , a Turkish trade union centre
 Domestic international sales corporation, a provision in U.S. tax law
 Dundee International Sports Centre, a sports centre in Scotland
 International Symposium on Distributed Computing, an academic conference
 Intervertebral disc, a cartilage between vertebrae
 Disk, a part of plant morphology

See also
 Cylinder (disambiguation) 
 Discus (disambiguation)
 Spelling of disc